Zero Dark Thirty is a film directed by Kathryn Bigelow.

Zero Dark Thirty may also refer to:
 Zero Dark 30, an album by Mike McClure
 "Zero Dark Thirty", a song by Aesop Rock from Skelethon
 Oh dark thirty, American military slang for an unspecified time between midnight and sunrise